Bramki  is a village in the administrative district of Gmina Błonie, within Warsaw West County, Masovian Voivodeship, in east-central Poland.

The village has a population of 1047 (data as of 30.06.2010).

References

Bramki